Sir Gordon William Duff,  (born 27 December 1947) is a British medical scientist and academic. He was Principal of St Hilda's College, Oxford, from 2014 to 2021. He was Lord Florey Professor of Molecular Medicine at the University of Sheffield from 1991 to 2014.

Early life and education
Duff was born on 27 December 1947. He was educated at Perth Academy, then a state grammar school in Perth, Scotland, and at Hipperholme Grammar School, a school in Hipperholme, Yorkshire, England. He studied medicine at St Peter's College, Oxford, graduating with a Bachelor of Arts (BA) degree in 1969 and Bachelor of Medicine and Bachelor of Surgery (BM BCh) degrees in 1975: as per tradition, his BA was promoted to a Master of Arts (MA Oxon) degree in 1975. He undertook postgraduate research in neuropharmacology at St Thomas's Hospital Medical School, University of London, completing his Doctor of Philosophy (PhD) degree in 1980. His doctoral thesis was titled "Some observations on body temperature regulation in the rabbit".

Career
From 1975 to 1976, Duff was a house officer in medicine at St Thomas' Hospital, London, and in surgery at Stracathro Hospital, Angus, Scotland.

From January 2013 to 2014, Duff served as the Chairman of the Medicines and Healthcare products Regulatory Agency. He stepped down in 2014, and was succeeded by Sir Michael Rawlins.

Duff was the Principal of St Hilda's College, Oxford, from 2014 to 2021. He was the first male head of the formerly all-female college. Since 1 July 2015, he has also been the Chair of the Biotechnology and Biological Sciences Research Council (BBSRC).

Personal life
In 1969, Duff married Naida Margaret Clarke, the daughter of Air Commodore Charles Clarke, OBE and Eileen Clarke. They have two daughters.

Honours
In the 2007 New Year Honours, Duff was appointed a Knight Bachelor, and therefore granted the title sir, "for services to public health". This was in recognition of his role in the inquiry into the conduct of a drugs trial at Northwick Park Hospital in 2006.

In 1999, Duff was elected a Fellow of the Academy of Medical Sciences (FMedSci). In 2008, he was elected a Fellow of the Royal Society of Edinburgh (FRSE). On 17 July 2017, he was awarded an honorary degree by the University of Sheffield.

Selected works

References

1947 births
Honorary Fellows of St Peter's College, Oxford
Knights Bachelor
Living people
Principals of St Hilda's College, Oxford
Fellows of the Royal Society of Edinburgh
People educated at Perth Academy
Alumni of St Peter's College, Oxford
Fellows of the Academy of Medical Sciences (United Kingdom)